The Sony Alpha 57 (model name SLT-A57) is a Digital single-lens reflex camera that replaced the A55 in 2012. The camera features an electronic viewfinder and a translucent mirror. The main advantage of a translucent mirror is that it needn't flip up out of the way when taking a picture in order to expose the sensor, but the camera can focus and capture images simultaneously. The camera's 15-point autofocus system can be set to single, continuous or automatic and is arranged towards the centre. The 12 fps burst mode is available only in "speed priority" mode but can reach up to 5.5 fps burst rate in combination with any other settings.

Feature list
 16.1-megapixel Exmor™ CMOS sensor (4912 × 3264) 
 Updated BIONZ™ image processor
 ISO 100 - 16,000 (25,600 with multi-image combination)
 Auto ISO 100 - 3200
 Pull-out three-hinge tilt/swivel 921K dot TruBlack™ LCD screen
 Stereo microphone and external mic socket
 Dust shake sensor cleaning
 second-generation Translucent Mirror Technology™
 12 fps burst mode at full 8-megapixel resolution
 Tru-Finder™ XGA electronic viewfinder with 1440K dots resolution with full 100% frame coverage.
 AVCHD video recording at 1920 × 1080 (50p/60p (1080p) @ 28 Mbit/s, 50i/60i (1080i) @ 24 Mbit/s, 50i/60i (1080i) @ 17 Mbit/s, 25p/24p (1080p) @ 24 Mbit/s, 25p/24p (1080p) @ 17 Mbit/s, 25p/24p (1080p)) @ 12 Mbit/s)
 MPEG-4 video recording at 1440 × 1080 (approx. 25/30 fps @ 12 Mbit/s (average bit-rate), 640 x 480 (approx 25/30fps @ 3Mbit/s)
 Live View with full-time Phase Detection AF
 15-point autofocus sensors.
 SteadyShot™ image stabilization system in body
 3D Sweep Panorama™
 Full tilt/swivel LCD screen
 Multi-frame noise reduction
 Object tracking AF

References

External links

 Sony Store listing of camera

57
Live-preview digital cameras
Cameras introduced in 2012